Armand Augustin Joseph Marie Ferrard, Comte de Pontmartin (1811-1890) was a French journalist, critic and man of letters.

Pontmartin was born at Avignon (Vaucluse), France, on 16 July 1811. A Legitimist sympathizer, he began his career by attacking the Encyclopédistes and their successors. In the Assemblée nationale he published his Causeries litteraires, a series of attacks on prominent Liberals, which created some sensation.

Pontmartin was an indefatigable journalist, and most of his papers were eventually published in volume form: Contes et reveries d'un planteur de choux (1845); Causeries du samedi (1857-1860); Nouveaux samedis (1865-1881), &c. But the most famous of all his books is Les Jeudis de Mme. Charbonneau (1862), which under the form of a novel offered a series of malicious and witty portraits of contemporary writers.

Pontmartin died at Avignon on 29 March 1890.

References

External links

 
 

1811 births
1890 deaths
Writers from Avignon
French literary critics
French essayists
French male essayists